Ojika Airport  is a public aerodrome, located about  southeast of the town office in Ojika, Nagasaki Prefecture, Japan.

History
The STOL (short take-off and landing) airport opened on 20 December 1985 on land reclaimed from the coastal strip at the island's southeasterly tip. Nagasaki Airways, rebranded as Oriental Air Bridge after March 2001, operated passenger services to two airports on Kyushu using BN2 light prop-planes. Flights to Fukuoka Airport was dropped in March 2004. The last regular connection, to Nagasaki Airport, saw only few passengers carried during 2005 and ended in March 2006. Since then, the airport remains in operation but only for private planes and for transporting emergency patients by helicopter. In 2018 just over 150 landings were reported mainly helicopters. Nagasaki Prefecture has discussed abolishing the airport and simply maintaining the runway in case of need for disaster relief.

References

Airports in Japan
Transport in Nagasaki Prefecture
Buildings and structures in Nagasaki Prefecture